A stile is a structure such as steps allowing pedestrians to cross a hedge or fence. Stile may also refer to:

Arts and media

Music
 Stile  antico ("ancient style"), a style of music composition
 Stile  concitato ("agitated style"), a Baroque style of music
 Stile  moderno ("modern style") or seconda pratica, a style of music composition

Other media
 Stile  Project or  StileNET, formerly a counter-culture website
 Stile, a side of a backdrop in a theatre: see Flats (theatre)
 Stile, the main character in the Apprentice Adept series by Piers Anthony

Structural elements
 Stile, a structure allowing pedestrians to cross a hedge or fence
 A vertical piece of wood in frame and panel construction
 A rigid beam supporting the rungs of a ladder

Other uses
 Ashok Leyland STiLE, a multi-purpose vehicle
 Chapel Stile, a hamlet in  the parish of Lakes,  Cumbria, in northwest  England
 High Stile, a mountain in  the western part of the Lake District in northwest England
 Stile Education, a science education company founded by Alan Finkel

See also
 Style (disambiguation)
 Stiles (disambiguation)